Polonus means "Pole" or Polish in Latin. In Polish it refers to a Pole living outside of Poland, a member of Polonia, the Polish diaspora. Regarding persons, Polonus was attributed to

People
Alexius Sylvius Polonus (1593–c. 1653), Polish Jesuit astronomer
Martin of Opava (died 1278)
Benedykt Polak
Jeremias Falck (1610–1677), artist from Danzig (Gdańsk)
Jan Polack (1435–1519), painter in Munich
John Bober, legendary 18th century early settler on Coche Island
John Scolvus, semi-legendary 15th century explorer

Other uses
Polonus Philatelic Society, a society of stamp collectors who specialize in the postage stamps and postal history of Poland